Fikri Cantürk (born 7 February 1933, in Ankara) is a Turkish painter and professor.

Biography 

Born in the village Karalar, Ankara, Fikri CANTÜRK completed his primary education attending the school “Eğitmenli” in his home town for the first three years and Hasanoğlu Village Institute Application Primary School for the remaining two years. He graduated from Hasanoğlu Village Institute in 1952. In the same year he was appointed to Koparan Village Primary School, which is nearby Ankara as the “School Principal”. He attended the Department of Painting, Gazi Institution of Education in 1954 and in 1957 he earned his degree. In 1957, he was appointed to Van-Emis (Alparslan) Teacher Training School. In 1958 he started Officer Cadet School. From 1958 to 1959, he completed his military service as a reserve officer in Mersin Petty Officer School. He worked as a teacher in Beşikdüzü Girls Teacher Training School from 1959 to 1960, in Trabzon High School in 1961 and in Ordu-Perşembe Teacher Training School from 1962 to 1965.

Academic career 

He was sent to France by the Ministry of Education in 1965. During 1965 and 1966, he did some research, investigation and works of art in Paris. In the same years he made some studies in Dijon Teacher Training School and with a couple of friends opened an exhibition in Dijon University.

When he was back in Turkey in 1967, he was appointed to Kütahya Girls’ Teacher Training School, and worked there as the chief of the workshop and the chief of education. In 1970, Mr. Cantürk was appointed to Samsun Institute of Education, where took part in the foundation of the Department of Painting and worked there as the head of the department for 10 years. Fikri Cantürk was rusticated from the university in the period of the Fascist Military Coup d’état on September 12, 1980. In 1983, he earned his bachelor's degree from the Department of Painting, which was later joined to Ondokuz Mayıs University.

From 1985 to 1988 he worked in Hacettepe University Fine Arts Faculty as a part-time academician.

He became an associate professor in 1987 and made a comeback to work for the Department of Painting in the Faculty of Education, Anadolu University. In 1992, he was appointed as the head of the Department and worked there until his retirement. He became the professor in 1993. Mr. Cantürk, who retired in 1998, is still working in his studio in Eskişehir.

As well as focusing on painting recently, Mr. CANTÜRK has not only been concerned with sculpture but also literature. Among his sculpture studies “ATATURK MONUMENT” in the gardens of Kütahya Girls’ Teacher Training School (1967) and Atatürk Primary School (1968) can be pointed out.

Published articles and books 

 Ninety-nine Pigeons and One Olive, (Poems) 1961,
 My Hands (Poems) 1963,
 Fundamental Problems in Plastic Arts, Anadolu University Publications. 1992, 
 Introduction to Arts and Esthetics (The Publication he was the Editor of) Anadolu University Publications 1993.
 Slums- Homes of Misery -1962, (Milliyet Newspaper article contest organized in the name for Ali Naci Karacan)
 Analysis of Sait Faik Stories (Research Article prepared with Güven Kalafat), Varlık Periodical, Issue: 604 155 August 1963

Selections from works of art are in 
Ankara Painting and Sculpture Museum, Denizli, Mersin Painting and Sculpture Museum, Anadolu University Museum of Modern Arts, Ministry of Culture, TRT, Ziraat, İş, Halk Bank, DYO, Presidency of General Staff Collections. Apart from all these, he has many works of art in official and private collections both in Turkey and in abroad.

Some of the exhibitions participated in 
In Turkey;

 State Painting and Sculpture Exhibitions
 DYO Exhibitions
 Exhibitions of the society of United Artists and Sculpture
 Exhibitions of the Artist graduated from Teacher Training Institute
 Many others including the Exhibitions by the group Art Again 2000

In Abroad;

 5th, 7th and 11th Monaco The Modern Plastic Arts Exhibition
 The 3rd Biennial by Balkan Peace and Friendship District as representative of Turkey in 1982
 Exhibitions organized in Germany, Austria, Kuwait, as representative of Turkey
 The year of Japan and Turkey, Examples from Contemporary Turkish Painting in 2003

Awards received 

 1971	“Special Jury Award” in the 5th DYO Exhibition
 1976	The award of achievement in the 37th State Painting and Sculpture Exhibition
 1977	“Mention of Honor” in the 11th DYO Exhibition
 1982	The award of achievement in the 41st State Painting and Sculpture Exhibition
 1981	Award for the First-Runner-Up in the Competition Organized  by the Ministry of Culture on the subject “The War of Independence and The Revolutions of Atatürk” on the 100th anniversary of Atatürk’ s Birthday
 1985	Award in the 19th DYO Exhibition 
 1986	“The Mention of Honor” in the Competition Organized by the Turkish Grand National Assembly on the Subject “National Sovereignty and Peace”  
 1987	The award of achievement in the 48th State Painting and Sculpture Exhibition
 1987	The mention of Honor in the TAPO Atatürk the 6th Painting Competition
 2002	Gazi University, 75 Years in Education “Plate of Honor”
 2007	Eskişehir Art Association, “Art Incentive Reward”
 2010	Eskişehir Art Association, “Reward of Exertion in Art”
 2011	BRHD 40. Years “Honor Award”

Exhibitions held 

 1963	Poetry Exhibition visually and audibly supported- SAMSUN
 1965	Poetry Exhibition visually and audibly supported- ORDU
 1970	State Gallery of Fine Arts- ANKARA
 1986	Mige Art Gallery- ANKARA
 1987	Doku Art Gallery- ANKARA
 1988	Dönüşüm Art Gallery- ANKARA
 1991	Armoni Art Gallery- ANKARA
 1993	Emlak Bank Art Gallery- ANKARA
 1993	Palet Art Gallery- ISTANBUL
 1999	Doku Art Gallery- ANKARA
 1999	Boyut Art Gallery- ANKARA
 2000	Gallery Soyut- ANKARA
 2001	Gallery Soyut- ANKARA
 2002	Sergi Art Gallery- ANKARA
 2003	Skala Art Gallery- ESKİŞEHIR
 2003	Istanbul Security Exchange Art Gallery- ANKARA
 2003	Soyut Art Gallery- ANKARA
 2004	İMKB Ankara Art Galery, ANKARA
 2004	Art Fair (AKM), İSTANBUL
 2005	Art Fair (AKM), ANKARA
 2005	Ege Art (AKM), İZMİR
 2006	State Gallery of Fine Arts- ESKISEHIR
 2007	Gallery Soyut- ANKARA
 2007	Vestel Art Gallery, ESKİŞEHİR
 2008	Gallery G&G- ANKARA
 2010	Gallery G&G- ANKARA
 2011	Gallery G&G- ANKARA

References

1933 births
Living people
Academic staff of Anadolu University
Academic staff of Hacettepe University
Turkish male painters
Turkish writers